Omobranchus woodi, the Kappie blenny, is a species of combtooth blenny found in the southeast Atlantic and western Indian Ocean.  This species can grow to a length of  SL. The identity of the person honoured in this species' specific name is given as J. Wood of Natal who collected many marine specimens, including the type of this species.

References

woodi
Fish described in 1908
Taxa named by John Dow Fisher Gilchrist
Taxa named by William Wardlaw Thompson